Jakub Sládek (born February 17, 1990) is a Czech professional baseball first baseman for Kotlářka Praha of Extraliga.

Career
He previously played for the Philadelphia Phillies organization.

In 2012, he played for the Ishikawa Million Stars of the Baseball Challenge League.

International career
He was selected for the Czech Republic national baseball team at the 2009 Baseball World Cup, 2010 European Baseball Championship, 2010 Intercontinental Cup, 2012 European Baseball Championship, 2013 World Baseball Classic Qualification, 2014 European Baseball Championship, 2015 Summer Universiade, 2015 USA Tour, 2017 World Baseball Classic Qualification, and 2016 European Baseball Championship.

And also he selected for the All Euro at the 2015 exhibition games against Japan.

References

External links

1990 births
Living people
Baseball first basemen
Czech expatriate baseball players in the United States
Czech expatriate sportspeople in Germany
Czech expatriate sportspeople in Japan
Expatriate baseball players in Japan
Florida Complex League Phillies players
Ishikawa Million Stars players
Sportspeople from Prague
2016 European Baseball Championship players